The 1988–90 Hartford Whalers season was the Whalers' eleventh season in the National Hockey League.

Offseason
On May 12, 1989, the Whalers announced that general manager Emile Francis would be promoted to team president. Replacing Francis as general manager of the club was Eddie Johnston. Johnston had previously held the general manager position with the Pittsburgh Penguins from 1983 to 1988. During his tenure with the Penguins, the club drafted Mario Lemieux with the first overall selection in the 1984 NHL Entry Draft.

Four days later, on May 16, Johnston fired head coach Larry Pleau. Pleau led the Whalers to a 81-117-26 record over parts of five seasons as head coach of the club from 1980 to 1988. Pleau also had previously been the general manager of the club from 1981 to 1983. Just over two weeks later, Hartford hired Rick Ley to take over as head coach of the team. Ley had played with the Whalers when they played in the World Hockey Association from 1972 to 1979, then in the National Hockey League from 1979 to 1981. Ley would have his number retired by the club on December 26, 1982. In 1981-82, Ley worked as an assistant coach with the Whalers. Midway in the 1982-83, Ley took over head coaching duties with the Binghamton Whalers, leading them to a 22-17-5 record in 44 games. From 1984 to 1988, Ley was the head coach of the Muskegon Lumberjacks of the IHL, leading the club to three 50+ win seasons in four years, while winning the Turner Cup during the 1985-86 season. In 1988-89, Ley coached the Milwaukee Admirals, leading the team to a 54-23-5 record in his only season with the club.

At the 1989 NHL Entry Draft, held at the Met Center in Bloomington, Minnesota on June 17, the Whalers selected Bobby Holik from Dukla Jihlava of the Czechoslovak Extraliga. In 36 games during the 1988-89 season, Holik scored 10 goals and 25 points in 35 games. Other notable selections that Hartford made include Blair Atcheynum, Jim McKenzie, James Black, Scott Daniels and Michel Picard.

At the draft, the Whalers made a trade with the New Jersey Devils. Hartford acquired Pat Verbeek from the Devils in exchange for Sylvain Turgeon. In 1988-89, Verbeek scored 26 goals and 47 points in 77 games. His best season with New Jersey was in 1987-88, as Verbeek scored 46 goals and 77 points in 73 games, helping the club reach the post-season for the first time since the team relocated to New Jersey. In 463 career games, Verbeek scored 170 goals and 320 points since joining the Devils in 1982.

At the 1989 NHL Supplemental Draft, the Whalers selected Chris Tancill. In 44 games during the 1988-89 season with the Wisconsin Badgers, Tancill scored 20 goals and 43 points.

On July 1, Brent Peterson announced his retirement from hockey. Nineteen days later, the Whalers hired Peterson as an assistant coach.

The Whalers acquired Mikael Andersson from the Minnesota North Stars at the Waiver Draft held on October 2. Andersson played in 14 games with the Buffalo Sabres during the 1988-89 season, earning an assist. In 56 games with the Rochester Americans of the American Hockey League, Andersson scored 18 goals and 51 points.

Regular season

Final standings

Schedule and results

Playoffs
The Whalers lost to the Bruins 4 games to 3 in the Adams semi-finals.

Player statistics

Awards and records

Transactions
The Whalers were involved in the following transactions during the 1989–90 season.

Trades

Waivers

Free agents

Draft picks
Hartford's draft picks at the 1989 NHL Entry Draft held at the Met Center in Bloomington, Minnesota.

Farm teams

See also
1989–90 NHL season

References

External links

Hart
Hart
Hartford Whalers seasons
1989 in sports in Connecticut
Hart